Gerardo Arias (born 18 November 1985) is a Guatemalan footballer who plays for Primera División club Aurora.

He made his debut for the national Guatemalan team against Peru on 15 October 2014.

References

External links
 

1985 births
Living people
Guatemalan footballers
Guatemala international footballers
Association football midfielders
Deportivo San Pedro players
Deportivo Coatepeque players
Halcones FC players
C.D. Suchitepéquez players
Deportivo Petapa players
C.S.D. Municipal players
C.D. Guastatoya players
Cobán Imperial players
Xelajú MC players
Deportivo Achuapa players
Liga Nacional de Fútbol de Guatemala players
People from Escuintla Department